Jin Kandi (also Romanized as Jīn Kandī; also known as Jen Kandī) is a village in Ojarud-e Gharbi Rural District, in the Central District of Germi County, Ardabil Province, Iran. At the 2006 census, its population was 84, in 17 families.

References 

Tageo

Towns and villages in Germi County